Pulp Comics is a television show that aired on Comedy Central from 1996–2000. The show features stand-up comedians performing their acts, interspersed with original short films related to their rantings.

Episodes

Comedy Central original programming
1990s American sketch comedy television series
1990s American stand-up comedy television series
2000s American sketch comedy television series
2000s American stand-up comedy television series
1996 American television series debuts
2000 American television series endings